Omar Imady (born July 8, 1966) is a Syrian American scholar, novelist, and poet. In 2016, a second edition of his novel, The Gospel of Damascus, was published, along with an Arabic, French and Spanish translation.

Early life and education
He was born in Damascus on July 8, 1966, to Muhammad Imadi and Mildred Elaine Rippey.

Imady received his BA from Macalester College, and holds a PhD from the University of Pennsylvania. He was the disciple of Muhammad Bashir al-Bani, a Sufi Damascene Muslim scholar, from 1985 and until al-Bani's death in 2008.

Publications
Imady is the author of The Celest Experiment, a recipient of the Literary Titan Silver Award, Transference, a Pushcart Prize nominee (Litro Magazine), When Her Hand Moves, a collection of three  novellas, and The Gospel of Damascus, a Book of the Year Award (BOTYA) finalist in 2012 published in three English editions, and subsequently translated into Arabic, French and Spanish. The novel weaves Jewish, Christian, and Muslim traditions to tell the story of a Damascene man who becomes totally consumed with the idea that Damascus is the site of the Second Coming of Jesus. 

Imady is also the author, and coauthor, of several works on Syria and Sufism, including:  An Inside Story of Modern Syria: The Unauthorised Biography of a Damascene Reformer, Historical Dictionary of Syria Fourth Edition, The Syrian Uprising Domestic Origins and Early Trajectory, Syria at War, eight years on, Syria at War, five years On, Sufism and the Preservation of Syrian Spiritual Identity, Organisationally Secular: Damascene Islamist Movements and the Syrian Uprising, Civil Resistance in the Syrian Uprising: From Democratic Transition to Sectarian Civil War, How a microfinance network could have preempted the Syrian uprising, When You're Shoved from the Right, Look to Your Left: Metaphors of Islamic Humanism, and The Rise and Fall of Muslim Civil Society.

Center for Syrian Studies
After careers at the UNDP, and the New York Institute of Technology (Amman Campus), Imady joined the Center for Syrian Studies at the University of St Andrews in 2012. He was the Deputy Director of the Center, Managing Editor of the Center's journal, Syria Studies, and a Senior Fellow. In this capacity, he wrote regularly to the Center's blog Inspired by Syria, and appeared frequently on TV and Radio channels, including FRANCE 24, TRT World, and Euronews. In the spring of 2021, Imady left the Center for Syrian Studies to become a full time author.

References

External links
 Inspired by Syria - Media
 Inspired by Syria - Blog
 Sanduq: A microfinance innovation in Jabal Al-Hoss, Syria
 NYIT Jordan Celebrates Class of 2010
 Omar Imady – Centre for Syrian Studies (CSS) 
 Omar Imady - University of St Andrews 
 How a microfinance network could have preempted the Syrian uprising By Omar Imady
 FRANCE24 Interview
 FRANCE24 Interview
 euronews Interview
 TRT WORLD Interview
 TRT WORLD Interview
 TRT WORLD Interview
 TRT WORLD Interview
 TRT World Interview
 Deutsche Welle TV Interview
 Omar Imady speaks about his novel The Gospel of Damascus - English with English subtitles
 Omar Imady - Personal Website

1966 births
Living people
Writers from Damascus
Syrian novelists
American writers of Syrian descent
American people of Syrian descent
Macalester College alumni
University of Pennsylvania alumni